Faryab Rural District is a rural district (dehestan) in the Central District of Rudan County, Hormozgan Province, Iran. At the 2006 census, its population was 2,495, in 505 families. The rural district has 6 villages.

References 

Rural Districts of Hormozgan Province
Rudan County